Danville High School is a public high school serving the ninth through twelfth grades in Danville, Kentucky, United States. It is one of four schools and the only high school in the Danville School district.

Its boundary includes most of Danville.

School information
The student-teacher ratio is 16, which matches the state average of 16. Spending per pupil is $9,310, higher than the state average of $7,639.

The makeup of the student body is 51% male, 49% female, 72% White, not Hispanic, 24% Black, not Hispanic, 3% Hispanic, and 1% Asian/Pacific Islander. 44% of students are eligible for free or reduced-price lunch program.

In 2006 American College Testing (ACT) Statistics were:
 Composite Score: 21.5
 Math Score: 20.6
 English Score: 21.8
 Reading Score: 21.9
 Science Score: 21.2

Extracurricular activities

Athletics
Danville High School holds a long tradition of excellence in athletics, highlighted by 11 State Football Championships, 10 State Track and Field Championships (3 Boys', 7 Girls'), a number of State Cross Country Championships, and numerous Regional and District titles.
Danville High School competes in the following interscholastic sports:

 Baseball
 Boys' basketball
 Girls' basketball
 Cheerleading
 Cross country
 Football
 Golf
 Boys' soccer
 Girls' soccer
 Softball
 Swimming
 Boys' tennis
 Girls' tennis
 Track
 Volleyball
 Wrestling

Clubs and organizations
Students participate in the following clubs and organizations:

 Art Club
 Band
 Book Club
 Choir
 DECA
 Diversity Club
 Drama Club
 Fellowship of Christian Athletes (FCA)
 Forensics
 French Club
 Governor's Cup
 HOSA
 Junior Statesmen
 MADD
 National Honor Society
 Pep Club
 Roots and Shoots
 Second Step
 Spanish Club
 Student Council
 STLP
 Teens Against Tobacco Use (TATU)
 The Log
 Upward Bound
 Young Achievers

Forensics
Danville High School's forensics team is nationally recognized for its excellence. Coach Steve Meadows resurrected the team in 1994 after its founding in the late 1940s. Since that time, the team has garnered the Founder's Award at the Catholic National Forensic League National Tournament (2002), the Schwan's School of Excellence Trophy at the National Forensic League National Tournament (2007), six Kentucky High School Speech League (KHSSL) state championships (2006, 2007, 2008, 2009, 2012, 2017), four Kentucky Educational Speech and Drama Association (KESDA) state championships (2008, 2011, 2012, 2017), and numerous regional and invitational tournaments. In 2008, it became the only team ever in Kentucky to capture championships in all four major state contests in the same year - KHSSL, KESDA, National Forensic League (NFL) Districts, and Catholic National Forensic League (CFL) Districts. It repeated this feat in 2012 and 2017. The team has produced ten CFL and NFL national finalists. The team has also produced numerous individual event state champions. It holds Chair 214 at the Barkley Forum for High Schools, a national invitational tournament in which it has excelled by producing eleven finalists since 2004.

Notable alumni
John Fetterman, Pulitzer Prize-winning reporter
Ashley Gorley, songwriter and producer
Larnelle Harris, Gospel singer and songwriter
Maurice Manning, poet
James E. Rogers Jr., president and CEO of Duke Energy
Frank X. Walker, poet

References

External links
 Danville High School
 Danville Schools

Buildings and structures in Danville, Kentucky
Schools in Boyle County, Kentucky
Public high schools in Kentucky